Siarhei Rutenka, also Sergej Rutenka (born 29 September 1981) is a Belarusian former handball player. Besides Belarusian citizenship, he also acquired Slovenian citizenship in 2003. In January 2008, he received the Spanish nationality. His preferred position was outside left, but he was also capable of playing as the pivot and playmaker. He came to prominence while playing for the Slovenian club RK Celje and earlier for RK Gorenje. He has also played for FC Barcelona in Spain. The club acquired him for €1 million in 2009.

Rutenka was the top goalscorer at the 2006 European Men's Handball Championship, representing Slovenia. In 2013, he was elected best left-back of the year.

He is the older brother of handball player Dzianis Rutenka.

References

1981 births
Living people
Belarusian male handball players
Spanish male handball players
Slovenian male handball players
Olympic handball players of Slovenia
Handball players at the 2004 Summer Olympics
Liga ASOBAL players
Sportspeople from Minsk
BM Ciudad Real players
FC Barcelona Handbol players
Expatriate handball players
Belarusian expatriate sportspeople in Spain